is a city located in Miyagi Prefecture, Japan. , the city had an estimated population of 52,662, and a population density of 3,032 persons per km² in 23,270 households.

Geography
Shiogama is in north-central Miyagi Prefecture, bordered by the Pacific Ocean to the east.

Neighboring municipalities
Miyagi Prefecture
Tagajō
Rifu
Shichigahama

Climate
Shiogama has a humid climate (Köppen climate classification Cfa) characterized by mild summers and cold winters.

Demographics
Per Japanese census data, the population of Shiogama peaked around 1990 and has declined since.

Etymology
"Shiogama" means "salt furnace" and refers to a local Shinto ritual involving the making of salt from sea water, still performed every July.  The name is sometimes written using the kanji 塩釜 rather than 塩竈 and both spellings are officially permitted.  Both 釜 and 竈 are pronounced gama in compounds, but as lone words they are pronounced kama and kamado, respectively.  A kamado (竈, "furnace") is what a kama (釜, "kettle") is placed upon, and so the two are not completely interchangeable.  塩竈 is the form officially used by the city, but for ease of writing, the 10-stroke 釜 is often used in place of the 21-stroke 竈, such as in Shiogama Station.

Shiogama Jinja uses the rendering 鹽竈, with an archaic character for salt.  This third form is rarely seen outside of this context.

History
The area of present-day Shiogama was part of ancient Mutsu Province, and has been settled since at least the Jōmon period by the Emishi people. During the Nara period, the area came under the control of colonists from the Yamato dynasty based at nearby Tagajō and was the most important seaport in Mutsu. The ruins of the provincial capital of Mutsu Province have been found within the city borders. During later portion of the Heian period, the area was ruled by the Northern Fujiwara. During the Sengoku period, the area was contested by various samurai clans before the area came under the control of the Date clan of Sendai Domain during the Edo period, under the Tokugawa shogunate.

The town of Shiogama was established with the post-Meiji restoration creation of the modern municipalities system on April 1, 1889. Parts of Tagajō and Shichigahama were incorporated into Shiogama of September 1, 1938. Shiogama was raised to city status on November 23, 1941 (187th, nationally; 3rd in Miyagi). The city annexed the Gyūchi area of neighboring Tagajō on December 1, 1949 and the village of Urato on April 1, 1950.

The city was affected by the tsunami caused by the 2011 Tōhoku earthquake, although damage to its fishing industry turned out to be light.

Government
Shiogama has a mayor-council form of government with a directly elected mayor and a unicameral city legislature of 18 members.

Economy
The economy of Shiogama is largely based on commercial fishing, especially of tuna, and fish processing.  The city also boasts one of the highest density of sushi restaurants in Japan.

Education
Shiogama has six public elementary schools and four middle schools operated by the city government, and one public high school operated by the Miyagi Prefectural Board of Education.

Transportation

Railway
East Japan Railway Company (JR East) – Tōhoku Main Line 
 
East Japan Railway Company (JR East) – Senseki Line 

Highway

National highways

Miyagi Prefectural Highways
 Miyagi Prefectural Route 3 (Shiogama—Yoshioka)
 Miyagi Prefectural Route 10 (Shiogama—Watari)
 Miyagi Prefectural Route 11 (Shiogama—Shiogama-kō)
 Miyagi Prefectural Route 23 (Sendai—Shiogama)
 Miyagi Prefectural Route 35 (Izumi—Shiogama)
 Miyagi Prefectural Route 58 (Shiogama—Shichigahama—Tagajō)

Local attractions

Festivals
 Shiogama 'Hote' festival (10 March)
 Shiogama Flower festival and Shiogama Citizens Festival (late April)
 Shiogama Harbor festival (Eve: before Marine Day/festival: Marine Day July)

Specialties and crafts

 raw tuna (Maguro) catches in Japan
 Sushi restaurant density in Japan
 Sasa Kamaboko (fish paste and roasted into the shape of sasa (bamboo leaf)) processed fishery production in Japan

 Sweets (Shihogama, Namadora, etc.)
 Japanese sake (Shiogama brands: Uragasumi Zen, Omotaka Otokoyama, Shiki no Matsushima, Date no Iki, etc.)

Visitor attractions 

 Shiogama Jinja
 Shiwahiko Jinja
 Okama Jinja
 Magaki Jinja
 Shiogama Port
 Shiogama Fish Market

 Urato Islands
 Nagai Shiyouiti Manga Museum
 Shiogama-city Community Center (Fureai ESP Shiogama)
 Shiogama Kyokusui
 Noda no Tamagawa (One of Japan's six Tamagawa)
 Mother and child stone
 Marine Gate Shiogama

Notable people from Shiogama
Masao Maruyama (anime producer) 
Masashi Nakano (politician)
Nobunaga Shimazaki (voice actor)
Koichi Yamadera (voice actor)

References

External links

Official Website 

Cities in Miyagi Prefecture
Populated coastal places in Japan
Shiogama, Miyagi